Grand Forks freight station is a former freight warehouse in Grand Forks, North Dakota, United States, built for the Great Northern Railway in 1904, during the Second Dakota Boom.

It was listed on the National Register of Historic Places (NRHP) in 1990 as the Great Northern Freight Warehouse and Depot, at which time it was being renovated into rental apartments.

See also
Northern Pacific Depot and Freight House, also NRHP-listed in Grand Forks

References

Great Northern Railway (U.S.)
Railway freight houses on the National Register of Historic Places
Railway buildings and structures on the National Register of Historic Places in North Dakota
Railway stations in the United States opened in 1904
National Register of Historic Places in Grand Forks, North Dakota
1904 establishments in North Dakota